Cry is the fifth studio album by American country music singer Faith Hill. It was released October 15, 2002, via Warner Bros. Nashville and sold 472,486 copies in its first week, a career-best for Hill. The album was intended as a crossover project for her, and although three of its singles were released to country radio, none reached the top ten. The title track and "One" were both adult contemporary hits, however, with the former spending 11 weeks at number one.

Upon release, Cry was met with mixed reviews, with critics divided on the lack of country influences. The album went on to sell 4 million copies worldwide and has been certified 2× Platinum by the RIAA. Hill has defended the polarizing creative direction of Cry, telling Billboard that "it was definitely a different record," but that she is still "so proud of [the album]." Cry ranked at #179 on the Billboard Top 200 albums of the decade 2000–09.

Content
Cry is led off by its title track, written by Angie Aparo. This song reached number 12 on the country singles charts, the lowest country peak she has achieved with a lead-off single. "When the Lights Go Down" and "You're Still Here" were also released to country radio, peaking at number 26 and number 28 respectively. "One" did not chart on the country singles charts, although it was a number 7 adult contemporary hit. "Baby You Belong" was only released as a single in Japan, but was used as the theme song for the 2002 film Lilo and Stitch. The song's music video features clips from the film. The album was produced primarily by Byron Gallimore and Dann Huff, who also worked on 1999's Breathe, with additional production from Hill and Marti Frederiksen.

Critical reception

Cry received mixed reviews from music critics. At Metacritic, which assigns a normalized rating out of 100 to reviews from mainstream critics, the album received an average score of 59, based on 8 reviews. Chris Willman of Entertainment Weekly praised Hill for taking stylistic risks but conceded that the album "invites some of the criticism that will inevitably come its way." Billboard wrote that "Cry is a confident effort, with Hill laying claim as queen of" pop-country, however the magazine also described the songs as "sometimes bland" and "repetitive." AllMusic writer Robert L. Doerschuk was ambivalent towards the album's production, writing that "her established skills as a song interpreter are lost in all this sturm und drang and her voice, while undeniably powerful at its peak, doesn't have the range that allows most singers in this style... to at least milk the material."

Rolling Stone found the album to be "contrived" and impersonal, with Barry Walters writing, "[Hill is] an expert in the yelps and sighs that signify pop passion, and what she lacks in personality she makes up for with power, professionalism and unfailing hooks." Robert Hillburn of the Los Angeles Times was particularly critical, rating the album one-and-a-half stars out of four. "The songs ... are mediocre," he writes, "her vocals are rarely convincing, and the arrangements are ham-fisted."

In a piece commemorating Crys tenth anniversary, Billy Dukes of Taste of Country theorized that the polarizing opinions on the album were a result of the "building tension" at the time between country "purists" and fans of the contemporary pop influences.

Commercial performance
Cry debuted at number one on both the Billboard Top Country Albums chart and the all-genre Billboard 200 chart dated November 2, 2002. The album sold over 472,000 copies in its first week, marking a career high sales week for Hill and also setting a new record for the largest first-week sales figure by a solo female country artist since Nielsen SoundScan began tracking sales in 1991. It spent three non-consecutive weeks at the top position on the former.

Track listing

Personnel
Performance credits

Music credits

Production credits

Visual and imagery

Charts

 Weekly charts 

 Year end charts 

Decade end charts

Certifications and sales

AwardsGrammy Awards'

References

External links
 
 Cry at AllMusic

2002 albums
Faith Hill albums
Warner Records albums
Albums produced by Marti Frederiksen
Albums produced by Dann Huff
Albums produced by Byron Gallimore